Kasturba Road is a street in Bangalore, the capital of Karnataka, India, which is connected to M G Road to the north and J C Road to the south. Some important landmarks situated along Kasturba Road are Sree Kanteerava Stadium, Kanteerava Indoor Stadium, Cubbon Park, Government Museum, Venkatappa Art Gallery, Visvesvaraya Industrial and Technological Museum and UB City. A 600-year-old Ganesha temple is also situated on Kasturba Road.

It was earlier known as Sydney Road.

Other important landmarks close to the road are Karnataka High Court, Vidhana Soudha and Chinnaswamy Stadium.

References

Roads in Bangalore
Tourist attractions in Bangalore
Memorials to Kasturba Gandhi